Wing Chun (Chinese: 詠春 or 咏春, lit. "singing spring") is a concept-based fighting art, form of Southern Chinese kung fu, and close-quarters system of self-defense.

Etymology
In Chinese, this martial art is referred to as 咏春拳 (simplified script) or 詠春拳 (traditional script). If it is written in an almost identical way in traditional and simplified, it is not pronounced and transcribed in the same way according to the regions and their dialects: Yǒngchūn quán in Mandarin pinyin, Wing-chun kuen in Cantonese Wade-Giles. It is made up of 2 terms: 拳 (quan/kuen) which means “fist, boxing” and the term 詠春 (wing-chun, in Cantonese) meaning "singing spring". The full name is thus translated as "singing spring boxing".

In its short designation, the martial art is simply designated by these two sinograms:
 the sinogram 詠 yǒng/wing: "to sing, to sing..."
 the sinogram 春 chūn/chun: "spring, vitality..."

This martial art is sometimes referred to by 永春, characters different from 詠春, but pronounced and transcribed in the same way: They are literally translated as "eternal spring", the character 永 meaning "eternal, endless". These characters also designate the Yongchun region near the city of Quanzhou (Fujian). 

If the use of 詠春 seems privileged today for wing chun styles, 永春 still appears in the name of other southern Chinese martial arts (with 永春 often transcribed Weng Chun); for example jee shim weng chun and Yǒng Chūn Bái Hè Quán (永春白鶴拳).

Romanization

In the West, the name of this martial art has been transcribed variably due to the use of different or personal Chinese language romanization methods, and differences in pronunciation between Chinese languages (but Cantonese was often preferred) or according to Western languages. In addition, some wing chun masters voluntarily created their own term, in order to dissociate their personal teaching from traditional teachings. For example, Yip Man's Ving Tsun or Leung Ting's Wing Tsun.

Finally, this martial art is pronounced quite identically in the West, but is written with many spellings: ving tsun, wing tsun, wing tsung, yongchun, weng chun, wyng tjun, ving tjun, wing tzun, wing tschun. Wing Chun is the most common form, used apply to all lineages of this martial art.

Context
Context of the name Wing Chun varies between various branches of Wing Chun. Common legend is that the name is derived from Yim Wing-chun, the mythical progenator of the martial art, who was a student of the legendary Abbess Ng Mui.

According to the Hung Suen / Hung Gu Biu lineage, the Ng Mui / Yim Wing Chun legend was conceived to protect the identity of Cheung Ng, a Shaolin monk who survived the Manchurian massacres and took refuge at Red Boat Opera. The "Yim Wing Chun" name was chosen for specific reasons, as Yim could be understood as the word for "Secret" or "Protected", and "Wing Chun" referring to Siu Lam Wing Chun Tong (the Always Spring Hall). With "Yim Wing Chun" being a secret code for "the secret art of Siu Lam Wing Chun Hall."

In the Pan Nam lineage, the "Wing" in Wing Chun comes from Chan Wing-wah, one of the founders of Hongmen. According the Pao Fa Lien lineage, the name Wing Chun is a shortened form of the revolutionary motto, "Wing yun chi jee; Mo mong Hon Juk; Dai dei wu chun." A secret code that allowed the anti-Qing revolutionaries to recognize each other. Eventually, the codeword was shortened to Wing Chun (Always Spring.)

Origins

The definitive origin of Wing Chun remains unknown, and is attributed to the development of Southern Chinese Martial Arts. Complications in the history and documentation of Wing Chun are attributed to the art being passed from teacher to student orally, rather than in writing. Another reason is the secrecy of its development, due to its connections to Anti-Qing rebellious movements.

There are at least eight different distinct lineages of Wing Chun, each having its own history of origin. Additionally, there are competing genealogies within the same branch or about the same individual teacher. The eight distinct lineages of Wing Chun which have been identified are:

 Ip Man
 Yuen Kay-shan
 Gu Lao Village 
 Nanyang / Cao Dean
 Pan Nam
 Pao Fa Lien
 Hung Suen / Hung Gu Biu 
 Jee Shim / Weng Chun

Regardless of the origins espoused by various Wing Chun branches and lineages, there is much third-party controversy and speculative theorizing regarding the true origins of Wing Chun. In the West, Wing Chun's history has become a mix of fact and fiction due to the impacts of early secrecy and modern marketing.

Wing Chun at present 
Of the eight Wing Chun lineages, the Ip Man and Yuen Kay-shan lineages are the most profilic branches of Wing Chun worldwide. The other lineages are pretty much unknown outside of China, except for the Pan Nam line, which survives in the USA and the Jee Shim / Weng Chun line with a strong presence in Germany. Also, Yuen Chai Wan form of Wing Chun has notable presence in Vietnam, with this lineage having earned the moniker of "Vietnamese Wing Chun." 

In 1949, Ip Man, considered the grandmaster of modern Wing Chun, brought the style from China to Hong Kong and eventually to the rest of the world. Yip Man's most famous student was Bruce Lee, who had studied under Yip Man before he moved to the United States. Lee is also credited for popularizing Wing Chun internationally, although he would later develop his own martial arts philosophies (namely Jeet Kune Do) that contain many Wing Chun influences.

The Ving Tsun Athletic Association
The Ving Tsun Athletic Association was founded in 1967 by Cantonese master Ip Man and seven of his senior students so they could teach Wing Chun together and Ip Man would not take on all the work himself. The first public demonstration of the Wing Chun fighting system, according to Ip Man, took place in Hong Kong at an official exhibition fight in the winter of 1969 at what was then the Baptist College (now the Hong Kong Baptist University). Leung Ting, a student of Ip Man, invited his master and some well-known representatives of the martial arts scene of the time to the college and conducted the exhibition fights in front of the specialist audience. The Association helped Wing Chun to spread to the rest of the world.

Organizational structure in modern Europe
There is no uniform umbrella organization in Europe under which Wing Chun practitioners are grouped, but rather numerous, sometimes competing and divided associations, schools, and individual teachers. Most associations do not appear in the legal form of associations that have voluntarily merged to form an association, but as commercial organizations in which associated schools are integrated, which are authorized and certified by the association. Some of the associations are organized in a franchise system.

In some associations, based on the family system that was used in the past, obedience and obligations towards the master and his teacher are emphasized, although these are rarely directly related to their training students.

Characteristics

General
Wing Chun puts emphasis on economic movement and encourages its practitioners to "feel" through their opponents defenses and to utilize the incoming attacks with deflection, rapid punches and finger pokes. Slapping and defensive manuevers are used to distract the opponent to make them shift their defenses away from their centerline. 

Wing Chun favors a relatively high, narrow stance with the elbows close to the body. Within the stance, arms are generally positioned across the vital points of the centerline with hands in a vertical "wu sau" ("protecting hand" position). This puts the practitioner in a position to make readily placed blocks and fast-moving blows to vital striking points down the center of the body, i.e. the neck, chest, belly, and groin. Shifting or turning within a stance is done on the heels, balls, or middle (K1 or Kidney point 1) of the foot, depending on the lineage. Some Wing Chun styles discourage the use of high kicks because this risks counter-attacks to the groin. The practice of "settling" one's opponent to brace them more effectively against the ground helps one deliver as much force as possible.

Relaxation 
Softness (via relaxation) and performance of techniques in a relaxed manner, and by training the physical, mental, breathing, energy, and force in a relaxed manner to develop Chi "soft wholesome force", is fundamental to Wing Chun. On "softness" in Wing Chun, Ip Man said during an interview:

Teaching structure in the past
In ancient China, Wing Chun, like all other martial arts or craft guilds, was traditionally passed on in a familiar way, from master to student. The master, who had personal responsibility for the entire training of the student (apprentice), was addressed as Sifu (master). The lessons often took place in the master's house, where a personal bond would develop between the master and his family and the student (apprentice), with certain mutual obligations. The first public martial arts schools were established in Hong Kong. Since then, Wing Chun lessons have taken on a more modern, academic, and commercial character.

In some schools, however, the family system was still maintained. Lo Man-kam, a nephew of Ip Man, still teaches his students in his home in Taipei. Suitable selected long-term students are still accepted into the inner circle of the Wing Chun family by the Sifu in the traditional way, through a master-student tea ceremony. This ceremony underlines the deep personal bond that has developed between master and student through the long training period.

Forms

Most common forms 

The most common system of forms in Wing Chun consists of three empty hand forms, two weapon forms: the Dragon pole and Butterfly swords, and a wooden dummy form.

Empty hand

Wooden dummy

Other forms 
San Sik (Chinese: 散式; Cantonese Yale: Sáan Sīk; pinyin: Sǎn Shì; 'Separate forms'), along with the other three forms, is the basis of all Wing Chun techniques. They are compact in structure, and can be loosely grouped into three broad categories: (1) Focus on building body structure through basic punching, standing, turning, and stepping drills; (2) Fundamental arm cycles and changes, firmly ingraining the cardinal tools for interception and adaptation; (3) Sensitivity training and combination techniques.

Weapons 
The Yuen Kay Shan / Sum Nung branch also historically trained to throw darts (Biu).

In film and popular culture 

Donnie Yen played the role of Wing Chun Grandmaster Ip Man in the 2008 movie Ip Man,  and in its sequels Ip Man 2,  Ip Man 3, and Ip Man 4. The Ip Man series of movies is credited for reviving interest in the martial art in the 2010s and the Ip Man trilogy received critical acclaim in the box office. Ip Man was Bruce Lee's master, which made the trilogy so popular. Lee was largely responsible for launching the "kung fu craze" of the 1970s.

In December 2019, a new Wing Chun fighter named Leroy Smith was introduced to the fighting game Tekken 7 roster as downloadable content. When creating characters to represent real-world martial arts, the developers wanted to introduce a new fighter utilizing Wing Chun. The developers consulted Ip Man's nephew, who provided motion capture for the character.

Notable practitioners 

Some notable practitioners of Wing Chun are Ip Man and his sons Ip Chun and Ip Ching, Master Chu Shong Tin, martial artist Bruce Lee, Donnie Yen and actor Robert Downey Jr.

See also 
 Chinese martial arts
 Wing Chun terms
 Wushu
 List of films featuring Wing Chun

Bibliography

External links

Notes

References 

Chinese martial arts
Chinese swordsmanship
 
Buddhist martial arts